KRTI is a radio station airing a hot adult contemporary format licensed to Grinnell, Iowa, broadcasting on 106.7 MHz FM.  The station serves the areas of Grinnell, Iowa, Marshalltown, Iowa, Pella, Iowa, Newton, Iowa, and Marengo, Iowa, and is owned by Alpha Media, through licensee Alpha Media Licensee LLC.

References

External links
KRTI's official website

Hot adult contemporary radio stations in the United States
RTI
Alpha Media radio stations